Turk is a surname. Notable people with the surname include:

 Ahmet Türk (born 1942), Kurdish politician
 Alex Türk (born 1950), French politician
 Alexander Turk (1906–1988), Canadian politician
 Barbara Miklič Türk (born 1948), Slovenian politician and former First Lady
 Dan Turk (1962–2000), American football player
 Daniel Gottlob Türk (1756–1813), German musician
 Danilo Türk (born 1952), Slovenian politician
 Dilara Türk (born 1996), Turkish-German women's footballer
 Elizabeth Turk (born 1961), American artist
 Frank Turk (1817/1818–1887), American jurist & entrepreneur
 Frank Turk (biologist) (1911–1996), English entomologist and adult educationalist
 Gavin Turk (born 1967), British artist
 Gerd Türk, German singer
 Godwin Turk (born 1950), American football player
 Greg Turk (born 1961), American-born computer scientist & academic
 Gordon Turk, American musician
 Hanan Turk (born 1971), Egyptian actress & dancer
 Hasan Türk (born 1993), Turkish footballer
 Hikmet Sami Türk (born 1935), Turkish academic and politician
 James Clinton Turk (1923–2014), American jurist
 Matt Turk (born 1968), American football player
 Matt Turk (musician), American singer/songwriter, multi-instrumentalist and veteran performer
 M. K. Turk (1942–2013), American basketball coach
 Neil Turk (born 1983), English cricketer
 Rifaat Turk (born 1954), Palestinian football player
 Roy Turk (1892–1934), American songwriter
 Samuel Turk (1917–2009), American religious leader
 Stella Turk (1925–2017), British zoologist, naturalist, and conservationist
 Tommy Turk (1927–1981), American musician
 Warda al Turk (1797–1873), Lebanese poet
 William Turk (1866–1911), American musician
 Željko Turk (born 1962), Croatian politician

See also
 al-Turk
 Mustafa Kemal Atatürk

Turkish-language surnames

Ethnonymic surnames